The University of Bedfordshire is a public research university with campuses in Bedfordshire and Buckinghamshire, England. The University has roots from 1882, however, it gained university status in 1993 as the University of Luton. The University changed its name to the University of Bedfordshire in 2006 by the approval of the Privy Council, following the merger of the University of Luton and the Bedford campus of De Montfort University.

It is spread across five campuses: there are three in Bedfordshire, in Bedford and Luton; and two in Buckinghamshire, in Aylesbury (for students studying Nursing and Midwifery), and in Milton Keynes. It is also active in London and Birmingham, as well as globally, with a growing portfolio of international partnerships as far afield as Egypt, Vietnam, Oman and Mauritius.

The University entered the Research Assessment Exercise in 2014 and achieved an improvement of 22 places in the REF Power Ranking – the fourth largest improvement in the sector with nearly half of its research considered to be world leading or internationally excellent.

In 2012, it achieved FairTrade status. The University has also come eighth in the UK in the People and Planet University Green League in 2019 and received the Eco Campus Platinum award in 2020.

The University of Bedfordshire has a vibrant and cosmopolitan student population that includes more around 20,000 students from over 100 countries, working collaboratively with around 40 academic partners, both in the UK and overseas, to deliver a range of course from foundation degrees to doctorates.  More than 40% of its student population come from families with no history of participation in higher education. Around 70% are mature returners to education and over half are from black or ethnic minority backgrounds.

Appointed in 2020, the current Vice Chancellor is Professor Rebecca Bunting. The most recent Chancellor of the University of Bedfordshire was John Bercow, the former Speaker of the House of Commons.

History
The University of Luton had its roots in the Luton Modern School, which was established in 1908 and the Luton Modern School and Technical Institute which opened in 1937. This became Luton College of Higher Education following the merger of Luton College of Technology and Putteridge Bury College of Education, in 1976. It obtained university status in 1993. 
The Bedford campus of De Montfort University was originally part of the Bedford College of Higher Education, which stemmed from Bedford Teacher Training College, founded in 1882, and Bedford Physical Training College, founded in 1903. The University was created by the merger of the University of Luton and the Bedford campus of De Montfort University in August 2006 following approval by the Privy Council.

Campuses
The University's two main campuses are in Luton and Bedford.In Buckinghamshire, the dedicated Mary Seacole Aylesbury campus for Healthcare students opened in February 2020 at Stoke Mandeville Hospital, in partnership with Buckinghamshire Healthcare NHS Trust (BHT).
A smaller fourth campus at Milton Keynes became part of the university in 2012, offering a variety of degree courses as well as Continuing Professional Development (CPD) programmes.

On the outskirts of Luton, is the University’s Putteridge Bury campus. The campus is situated in approximately 30 acres of landscaped gardens. The current building was completed in 1911 and was designed by architects Sir Ernest George and Alfred Yeats in the style of Chequers, having had various redesigns and rebuilds over the years.

The site is utilised for University events including graduations, academic research symposia and seminars, The University of Bedfordshire Business School's postgraduate programmes, as well as a wide variety of public and private events including conferences, weddings, funeral receptions and public holiday functions.

Luton Campus

The University’s Luton campus is located in the town centre and is home to a purpose built STEM building, seven-storey library, a Postgraduate & CPD Centre, as well as an array of modern facilities to support each of the courses on offer.  These include the Media Arts Centre, a Moot Court, Business Pods, Healthcare Simulation Suites, a Campus Gym and a three-storey art studio with designated fashion and photography studios.

The University's Campus Centre, at Luton, opened in October 2010. It houses a 240-seat lecture theatre, an exhibition area for displaying student work, a Student Information Desk and Students' Union support services.

The Postgraduate and Continuing Professional Development Centre was completed in early 2013 and includes state-of-the-art IT and AV equipment, informal and quiet learning spaces, two "Harvard-style" lecture theatres.

The dedicated STEM building opened in 2019 and is set out over four storeys of teaching space including four computer laboratories and workshops for subjects such as automotive engineering, cyber-security and robotics, along with three large teaching labs, and four specialist containment labs.

Bedford Campus

The Bedford campus is close to Bedford town centre and local amenities. The University provides a free bus service running between the town centre and the campus. The campus includes a Physical Education and Sport Science Centre used to train athletes in the 2012 Olympic Games, and a Bedford Campus Centre boasting a 280-seat theatre, dance studios, a restaurant and social spaces for students. Liberty Park, on-site accommodation, offers 500 en-suite study bedrooms.

The Library was designed by van Heyningen and Haward Architects as a gateway to the campus. The building was completed in 2001 and provides approximately 360 individual study spaces, teaching space, staff work areas and traditional library services. There is also the Gateway building which offers teaching and informal learning spaces, lecture theatres and a student service centre over three storeys.

Mary Seacole, Aylesbury Campus 

The University’s Mary Seacole Campus opened in February 2020 at the Stoke Mandeville Hospital in Aylesbury and in partnership with Buckinghamshire Healthcare NHS Trust (BHT). 

The three-storey building, located on the hospital site, provides a specialist skills lab, set out as a hospital ward with state-of-the-art audio visual technology. There are also a suite of classrooms, a library, social learning spaces and computer study facilities.

Milton Keynes Campus
The Milton Keynes campus was originally established with the long term aim of becoming a new, independent university in Milton Keynes.

The institution began as 'the University Centre Milton Keynes' (UCMK), part of Milton Keynes College and supported by the University of Bedfordshire, the University of Northampton and the Open University. It was opened on 29 September 2008, with start-up funding provided by the Milton Keynes Partnership, which purchased the initial building (a former office block) in Central Milton Keynes.

In October 2009, the University of Bedfordshire (acting as lead academic partner) made a successful bid to the Higher Education Funding Council for England to expand provision at UCMK, one of just six such centres to have achieved this.

In September 2012 the centre ceased to be part of MK College and became a wholly owned subsidiary of the University of Bedfordshire. The university announced plans for a new campus in the city, with the new name of the institution being 'University Campus Milton Keynes', and this was opened at Saxon Court on Avebury Boulevard in September 2013.

Since March 2017, the brand 'UCMK' is no longer in use and the campus now operates as University of Bedfordshire Milton Keynes Campus.

Today, under the operation of the University of Bedfordshire, Milton Keynes campus offers foundation degrees, bachelor's degrees and master's degrees.

Organisation and structure
The University has four faculties: Creative Arts, Technologies and Science; Education and Sport; Health and Social Sciences; and the University of Bedfordshire Business School.

Academic profile
In 2000, the University of Luton was ranked 83 out of 93 British universities by The Times in their annual university ranking, rising to 72 out of 101 two years later.

The Sunday Times awarded the University of Luton the title of Best New University in 2004 (prior to the purchase of the Bedford campus and rebranding). The QAA conducted a thorough institutional audit of the university as a whole in 2005 (prior to the merger of the University), which resulted in the audit team's questioning of the academic standards of its awards and its lack of confidence in the university's quality standards. However, after the audit was taken, the QAA was provided with information that indicates that appropriate action was taken by the university in response to the findings of this report. As a result, the audit was signed off in July 2007. The University was subsequently commended by the QAA for the high quality and standards of our higher education provision in 2015.

The University appears in Times Higher Education World University rankings, is ranked as one of the top 300 universities in the world under 50 years old in the Young University rankings, and was awarded Silver in the first ever Teaching Excellence Framework (TEF) in 2017.

The University hosts the National Centre for Cyberstalking Research, opened in 2012, which carried out the first British study of cyberstalking and other forms of harassment online. In 2012, it established a UNESCO chair in New Media Forms of the Book to analyse trends in the use of electronic media, mobile media, and Internet technologies through research and practice.

Teaching quality
In 2004 The Sunday Times awarded the University the title of 'Best New University' and in 2007 it was short-listed for the Times Higher Education Supplement's University of the Year 2007.

Awards
 Awarded the Queen's Award for Enterprise: International Trade in 2011.
 Outstanding Finance Team winners in the Times Higher Education Leadership and Management Awards 2011.
 'Gold' award from Investors in People in 2011.
One of 21 Business Schools awarded the Bronze Award for start-up and business growth advice (Small Business Charter)
8th in the country in the University Green League (People and Planet 2019)

Educational partner institutions
The University works together with a number of partner institutions to offer a range of courses:

 Buckinghamshire College Group (Aylesbury)
 Barnfield College
 Bedford College
 Frontline
 Global Banking School
 Institute of Family Therapy
 London School of Commerce
 Milton Keynes College
 New Stamford College
 Pen Green Leadership Centre
 Emil Dale Academy
 Holmes Institute
 London Studio Centre
 Colombo International Nautical and Engineering College
 CTS College of Business and Computer Science, Trinidad
 Executive Business and Computational Institute, Mauritius
 Foreign Trade University, Vietnam
 Kaplan Higher Education, Hong Kong 
 Majan College, Oman 
 MAPS College, Maldives
 Marbella Design Academy, Spain
 Modern Sciences and Arts University, Egypt
 Music Production and Dance Academy, Italy 
 Middle East University, Jordan 
 Nations School of Business and Management, Guyana 
 Oxford College of Business, Sri Lanka 
 Patan College for Professional Studies, Nepal 
 SITAL College of Tertiary Education Limited, Trinidad and Tobago 
 SHEL School of Higher Education Limited, Trinidad and Tobago 
 SLIIT Academy, Sri Lanka
 STI Myanmar
 Westminster International College, Malaysia 
 Asian Centre for Management and Technology Ltd (LSC Dhaka), Bangladesh
 Hong Bang University, Vietnam
 Roots IVY International Schools, Pakistan

The University was a co-sponsor of UTC Central Bedfordshire, a university technical college which operated in Houghton Regis from 2012 - 2016.

Student life
The University of Bedfordshire Students' Union is affiliated to the National Union of Students, which represents students nationwide.

In 2020, Radio LaB 97.1FM - the University's affiliated community radio station - won two Community Radio Awards.

Notable alumni 

 Zema Abbey
 Rickie Haywood Williams
 Rachel Hopkins
 Gemma Hunt
 Becky Jago
 Stephen Kelman
 Ben Myers
 Melvin Odoom
 Richard Page
Dami Olonisakin

Photo gallery

See also
 Armorial of UK universities
 College of Education
 List of universities in the UK
 University of Bedfordshire Theatre

References

External links

 
 University of Bedfordshire Students' Union

 
Education in Luton
Educational institutions established in 2006
Education in the Borough of Bedford
2006 establishments in England
Buildings and structures in Luton
Bedfordshire